Dancing Rabbit may refer to:

Dancing Rabbit Ecovillage, an intentional community near Rutledge, Missouri
The Treaty of Dancing Rabbit Creek, the treaty between the United States and the Choctaw, forcing the removal of Choctaw from their lands east of the Mississippi River